Punjab University Oriental College, commonly known as Oriental College, is an institution of oriental studies in Lahore.
It is located next to Government College University, Lahore.

It was founded by Adi Brahmo Samaj preacher Pundit Navin Chandra Rai in 1876. He served as its vice principal from 1861. Aurel Stein, the noted Hungarian-British archaeologist, was principal from 1888 to 1899.

Notable alumni
 Muhammad Iqbal, Poet
 Faiz Ahmed Faiz, Poet
 Syed Ali Shah Geelani, Politician
 Khurshid Rizvi, Poet
 Anwar Masood, Poet
 Naeem Bokhari, Lawyer
 Saeed Ahmad Akbarabadi, 
 Shamsul Huda Panchbagi, Bangladeshi Islamic scholar and politician.

References

External links
 Government MAO College, Lahore at Pakistan National Digital Library.

 
Universities and colleges in Lahore
1876 establishments in British India
Educational institutions established in 1876